Grete Kunz (28 March 1909 – 5 June 1991) was a Czech painter. Her work was part of the painting event in the art competition at the 1936 Summer Olympics.

References

1909 births
1991 deaths
20th-century Czech painters
Czech women painters
Olympic competitors in art competitions
People from Šumperk District